Icon is the second greatest hits compilation album by American rapper Ja Rule, released on January 10, 2012 through Motown Records.

Track listing

Sample credits
 "Livin' It Up" contains excerpts from "Do I Do", written by Stevie Wonder.
 "Mesmerize" contains interpolations from "Stop, Look, Listen", written by Thom Bell and Linda Creed.
 "New York" contains interpolations from "100 Guns" written by Lawrence Parker.
 "Thug Lovin'" contains interpolations from "Knocks Me Off My Feet" written by Stevie Wonder.

References 

Ja Rule albums
2012 compilation albums